John Synge may refer to:

 John Lighton Synge (1897–1995), Irish mathematician and physicist
 John Millington Synge (1871–1909), Irish dramatist, poet, prose writer, and collector of folklore